Johnny Blue is a 1981 Thorleifs studio album. It peaked at 50th position on the Swedish albums chart.

Track listing
"Du hänger väl med opp" ("Making Your Mind Up")
"Håll mig närmare"
"Livets skatt"
"Trettifyran" ("This Ole House")
"Tiden som går (lär läka sår)" ("How Can You Mend a Broken Heart")
"Drömflicka" ("Dream Lover")
"Johnny Blue" ("Johnny Blue")
"Hallå där"
"La Paloma"
"En dröm" ("In Dreams")
"En ängel"
"No Particular Place to Go"

Charts

References 

1981 albums
Thorleifs albums
Swedish-language albums